Cian Ward is an Irish Gaelic footballer who currently plays for Meath Senior Football Championship team Wolfe Tones and, formerly, for the Meath county team. He is known for his free kick taking ability. In the 2009 All-Ireland, he was the third highest top scorer after Donegal's Michael Murphy and Kerry's Colm Cooper. Ward won his only Leinster title with Meath, and scored four points, in the controversial 2010 decider.  In 2011, Ward scored 4 goals and 3 points against Louth in front of a crowd 18,243 at Kingspan Breffni Park, to knock Louth out of the Championship. In 2013, Meath manager Mick O'Dowd dropped a number of players, including Ward, from the Meath panel.

Wolfe Tones went from the Meath Junior Football Championship to Meath Senior Football Championship winners in the space of four seasons in the early 21st-century, featuring Ward, whose emergence as one of Meath's "most exciting talents" coincided with this run, while 1996 All-Ireland Senior Football Championship-winning captain Tommy Dowd also joined the club around this time.

Honours
 Meath Senior Football Championship: 1
 2006
 Leinster Senior Football Championship: 1
 2010

References

Year of birth missing (living people)
Living people
Meath inter-county Gaelic footballers